The 2002 Abierto Mexicano Pegaso was a tennis tournament played on outdoor clay courts at the Fairmont Acapulco Princess in Acapulco in Mexico that was part of the International Series Gold of the 2002 ATP Tour and of Tier III of the 2002 WTA Tour. The tournament was held from February 25 through March 3, 2002.

Finals

Men's singles

 Carlos Moyá defeated  Fernando Meligeni 7–6(7–4), 7–6(7–4)
 It was Moyá's 1st title of the year and the 8th of his career.

Women's singles

 Katarina Srebotnik defeated  Paola Suárez 6–7(1–7), 6–4, 6–2
 It was Srebotnik's only title of the year and the 2nd of her career.

Men's doubles

 Bob Bryan /  Mike Bryan defeated  Martin Damm /  David Rikl 6–1, 3–6, [10–2]
 It was Bob Bryan's 1st title of the year and the 5th of his career. It was Mike Bryan's 1st title of the year and the 5th of his career.

Women's doubles

 Virginia Ruano Pascual /  Paola Suárez defeated  Tina Križan /  Katarina Srebotnik 7–5, 6–1
 It was Ruano Pascual's 2nd title of the year and the 15th of her career. It was Suárez's 2nd title of the year and the 22nd of her career.

External links
 Official website 
 ATP Tournament Profile
 WTA Tournament Profile

 
2002
Abierto Mexicano Pegaso
Abierto Mexicano Pegaso
February 2002 sports events in Mexico
March 2002 sports events in Mexico